Mauretania is the Latin name for a region in the ancient Maghreb. It stretched from central present-day Algeria westwards to the Atlantic, covering northern present-day Morocco, and southward to the Atlas Mountains. Its native inhabitants of Berber ancestry, were known to the Romans as the Mauri and the Masaesyli.

In 25 BC, the kings of Mauretania became Roman vassals until about 44 AD, when the area was annexed to Rome and divided into two provinces: Mauretania Tingitana and Mauretania Caesariensis. Christianity spread there from the 3rd century onwards. After the Muslim Arabs subdued the region in the 7th century, Islam became the dominant religion.

Moorish kingdom 

Mauretania existed as a tribal kingdom of the Berber Mauri people. In the early 1st century Strabo recorded Maûroi (Μαῦροι in greek) as the native name of a people opposite the Iberian Peninsula. This appellation was adopted into Latin, whereas the Greek name for the tribe was Mauroúsii (Μαυρούσιοι). The Mediterranean coast of Mauretania had commercial harbours for trade with Carthage from before the 4th century BC, but the interior was controlled by Berber tribes, who had established themselves in the region by the Iron Age.

King Atlas was a legendary king of Mauretania credited with inventing the celestial globe. The first known historical king of the Mauri, Baga, ruled during the Second Punic War of 218–201 BC. The Mauri were in close contact with Numidia. Bocchus I ([fl.] 110 BC) was father-in-law to the redoubted Numidian king Jugurtha.

After the death of king Bocchus II in 33 BC Rome directly administered the region from 33 BC to 25 BC. Mauretania eventually became a client kingdom of the Roman Empire in 25 BC when the Romans installed Juba II of Numidia as their client-king. On his death in AD 23, his Roman-educated son Ptolemy of Mauretania succeeded him. The Emperor Caligula had Ptolemy executed in AD 40. The Roman Emperor Claudius annexed Mauretania directly as a Roman province in AD 44, placing it under an imperial governor (either a procurator Augusti, or a legatus Augusti pro praetore).

Kings

Roman province(s) 

In the 1st century AD, Emperor Claudius divided the Roman province of Mauretania into Mauretania Caesariensis and Mauretania Tingitana along the line of the Mulucha (Muluya) River, about 60 km west of modern Oran:
Mauretania Tingitana was named after its capital Tingis (now Tangier); it corresponded to northern Morocco (including the current Spanish enclaves).
Mauretania Caesariensis was named after its capital Caesarea (now Cherchell); and comprised western and central Algeria.
 
Mauretania gave the empire one emperor, the equestrian Macrinus. He seized power after the assassination of Caracalla in 217 but was himself defeated and executed by Elagabalus the next year.

Emperor Diocletian's Tetrarchy reform (293) further divided the area into three provinces, as the small, easternmost region of Sitifensis was split off from Mauretania Caesariensis.

The Notitia Dignitatum (c. 400) mentions themas still existing, two being under the authority of the Vicarius of the diocese of Africa: 
A Dux et praeses provinciae Mauritaniae et Caesariensis, i.e. a Roman governor of the rank of Vir spectabilis, who also held the high military command of dux, as the superior of eight border garrison commanders, each styled Praepositus limitis ..., followed by (genitive forms) Columnatensis, Vidensis, inferioris (i.e. lower border), Fortensis, Muticitani, Audiensis, Caputcellensis and Augustensis.
A (civilian) Praeses in the province of Mauretania Sitifensis.

And, under the authority of the Vicarius of the diocese of Hispaniae:

Late Antiquity

Roman-Moorish kingdoms
During the crisis of the 3rd century, parts of Mauretania were reconquered by Berber tribes. Direct Roman rule became confined to a few coastal cities (such as Septem in Mauretania Tingitana and Cherchell in Mauretania Caesariensis) by the late 3rd century.

Historical sources about inland areas are sparse, but these were apparently controlled by local Berber rulers who, however, maintained a degree of Roman culture, including the local cities, and usually nominally acknowledged the suzerainty of the Roman Emperors.

In an inscription from Altava in western Algeria, one of these rulers, Masuna, described himself as rex gentium Maurorum et Romanorum (king of the Roman and Moorish peoples). Altava was later the capital of another ruler, Garmul or Garmules, who resisted Byzantine rule in Africa but was finally defeated in 578.

The Byzantine historian Procopius also mentions another independent ruler, Mastigas, who controlled most of Mauretania Caesariensis in the 530s. In the 7th century there were eight Romano-Moorish kingdoms: Altava, Ouarsenis, Hodna, Aures, Nemenchas, Capsa, Dorsale and Cabaon.

The last resistance against the Arab invasion was sustained in the second half of the 7th century mainly by the Roman-Moorish kingdoms -with the last Byzantine troops in the region- under the leadership of the Christian king of Altava Caecilius, but later ended in complete defeat in 703 AD (when the queen Kahina died in battle).

Vandal kingdom

The Vandals conquered the Roman province beginning in the 420s. 
The city of Hippo Regius fell to the Vandals in 431 after a prolonged siege, and Carthage also fell in 439. Theodosius II dispatched an expedition to deal with the Vandals in 441, which failed to progress farther than Sicily. The Western Empire under Valentinian III secured peace with the Vandals in 442, confirming their control of Proconsular Africa. For the next 90 years, Africa was firmly under the Vandal control. The Vandals were ousted from Africa in the Vandalic War of 533–534, from which time Mauretania at least nominally became a Roman province once again.

The old provinces of the Roman Diocese of Africa were mostly preserved by the Vandals, but large parts, including almost all of Mauretania Tingitana, much of Mauretania Caesariensis and Mauretania Sitifensis and large parts of the interior of Numidia and Byzacena, had been lost to the inroads of Berber tribes, now collectively called the Mauri (later Moors) as a generic term for "the Berber tribes in the province of Mauretania".

Praetorian prefecture of Africa

In 533, the Roman army under Belisarius defeated the  Vandals. In April 534, Justinian published a law concerning the administrative organization of the newly acquired territories. Nevertheless, Justinian restored the old administrative division, but raised the overall governor at Carthage to the supreme administrative rank of praetorian prefect, thereby ending the Diocese of Africa's traditional subordination to the Prefecture of Italy (then still under Ostrogoth rule).

Exarchate of Africa
The emperor Maurice sometime between 585 and 590 AD created the office of "Exarch", which combined the supreme civil authority of a praetorian prefect and the military authority of a magister militum, and enjoyed considerable autonomy from Constantinople. Two exarchates were established, one in Italy, with seat at Ravenna (hence known as the Exarchate of Ravenna), and one in Africa, based at Carthage and including all imperial possessions in the Western Mediterranean. The first African exarch was the patricius Gennadius.

Mauretania Caesariensis and Mauretania Sitifensis were merged to form the new province of Mauretania Prima, while Mauretania Tingitana, effectively reduced to the city of Septem, was combined with the citadels of the Spanish coast (Spania) and the Balearic islands to form Mauretania Secunda. The African exarch was in possession of Mauretania Secunda, which was little more than a tiny outpost in southern Spain, beleaguered by the Visigoths. The last Spanish strongholds were conquered by the Visigoths in 624 AD, reducing "Mauretania Seconda" opposite Gibraltar to only the fort of Septem.

Religion 
Christianity is known to have existed in Mauretania as early as the 3rd century. It spread rapidly in these areas despite its relatively late appearance in the region. Although it was adopted in the urban areas of Mauretania Caesariensis, the hinterlands retained the Romano-Berber religion.

Ancient episcopal sees of the late Roman province of Mauretania Sitifensis, listed in the Annuario Pontificio as titular sees:

See also 
 Gaetuli tribe (namesake of Getulia)
 Mauretania Caesariensis
 Mauretania Tingitana
 Syphax
 Victor Maurus, a Christian Mauretanian martyr and saint
 Zeno of Verona

References

Further reading

External links 

 Tingitana

 
Roman client kingdoms
Countries in ancient Africa
Ancient history of North Africa
States and territories established in the 3rd century BC
States and territories disestablished in the 1st century
3rd-century BC establishments
1st-century disestablishments
Ancient Greek geography of North Africa
44 disestablishments
Former kingdoms